North Carolina Highway 115 (NC 115) is a primary state highway in the U.S. state of North Carolina. It runs from U.S. Route 21 in North Charlotte north through Mecklenburg, Iredell and Wilkes counties. Its northern terminus is at its intersection with US 421 Business, NC 18 and NC 268 in North Wilkesboro.

Route description

History
NC 115 was established between 1929 and 1930 by the North Carolina State Highway Commission. It first appeared on official North Carolina state highway maps in 1930. At the time of establishment, the southern terminus of NC 115 was located at US 21, US 70, NC 10, NC 26, and NC 90 in Statesville. It travelled northwest through Iredell County before reaching its northern terminus at the Iredell County-Wilkes County Line. From its northern terminus, the road continued to US 421 and NC 60 near Wilkesboro. At the time of establishment, roughly the southern half of NC 115 was paved while the remainder of the roadway was a gravel, sand-clay, and topsoil roadway. 

The new section of NC 115 in Wilkes County was classified as a gravel, sand-clay, and topsoil roadway. By 1940, NC 115 was completely paved between Statesville and Wilkesboro. Within one year, the highway was extended north from its previous northern terminus to US 421 in North Wilkesboro. To accomplish this, NC 115 travelled along a brief concurrency with US 421 to the northwest. At the intersection, NC 115 turned southwest to run concurrently with the highways. Within North Wilkesboro, NC 115 used B Street and D Street as split streets between US 421 and Sixth Street. Sixth Street provided the connection for NC 115 between the two split streets. By 1959, NC 115 was extended south to US 21 near Charlotte. It ran in concurrency with US 21 or closely paralleled US 21 between its new southern terminus and Statesville. On March 1, 1975, NC 115 was removed from its concurrency with NC 18 and NC 268 in North Wilkesboro and was truncated to its current northern terminus. On August 26, 2003, northbound NC 115 was removed from Main Street between McClelland Street and Iredell Avenue, and Iredell Avenue between Main Street and Broad Street in Mooresville. The highway was rerouted to briefly follow McClelland Street between Main Street and Broad Street and then follow Broad Street to Iredell Avenue.

Major intersections

References

External links

NCRoads.com N.C. 115

115
Transportation in Mecklenburg County, North Carolina
Transportation in Iredell County, North Carolina
Transportation in Wilkes County, North Carolina